Sir Christopher Wren was one of the most highly acclaimed English architects in history, as well as an anatomist, astronomer, geometer, and mathematician-physicist. He was accorded responsibility for rebuilding 52 churches in the City of London after the Great Fire in 1666, including what is regarded as his masterpiece, St Paul's Cathedral, on Ludgate Hill, completed in 1710.

According to Kerry Downes, "there is considerable evidence that Wren," by the end of the 17th century, "delegated particular projects to [Nicholas] Hawksmoor." The nature and extent of Wren's involvement in the designs his office produced towards the end of his career is debated by scholars.

Built works

Extant works

Partially extant works

Demolished or destroyed works

Unbuilt works

Purported works 
A number of structure have, without supporting documentary evidence, been attributed to Christopher Wren. Speaking of this tendency, biographer Adrian Tinniswood has written that "If Wren was connected with a building, however remotely, it was slotted into the rapidly expanding canon."

Bibliography 

 
 Godwin, George (1839), Churches of London, Vols.1–2, C. Tilt

References 

Wren

Lists of buildings and structures in England